Quicken Interchange Format (QIF) is an open specification for reading and writing financial data to media (i.e. files).

Background
Although still widely used, QIF is a format older than Open Financial Exchange (OFX). The inability to reconcile imported transactions against the current account information is one of the primary shortcomings of QIF. Most personal money management software, such as Microsoft Money, GnuCash and Quicken's low end products (e.g. Quicken Personal and Quicken Personal Plus), can read QIF files to import information.  Intuit's Quicken used to be able to import QIF, too, but with its 2006 version it dropped that support for several important account types, including checking, savings, and credit card accounts. The Australian version of Quicken still allows the importing of QIF files for these account types. However, unlike the American version, it is not possible to export data to QIF or any other file type for any account type. The QIF format does not allow a user to mark the currency in which a transaction was completed. In some cases this may cause problems for users who do use multiple currencies when they export or import into another software package.

Quicken's proposed replacement for the QIF format has been the proprietary Quicken Web Connect (QFX) format.
It is commonly supported by financial institutions to supply downloadable information to account holders, especially by banks that support integration of Money or Quicken with their online banking. Not everybody, however, was, or is, happy with this replacement. Some banks dislike it because Quicken (Intuit) charges licensing fees to use QFX. Other banks pass the fees on by charging customers for downloading QFX files. Because Microsoft Money imports either QIF or OFX format files, and Microsoft does not charge banks any licensing fees to use OFX for Money, banks do not normally charge for downloading QIF and OFX files. (QIF and OFX are open formats, free for anyone to use.)

Data format
A QIF file typically has the following structure:

Each record ends with a ^ (caret).  All the data in the file is stored in ASCII strings, and the file could be edited in any text editor.

simple example
 !Type:Bank
 D03/03/10
 T-379.00
 PCITY OF SPRINGFIELD
 ^
 D03/04/10
 T-20.28
 PYOUR LOCAL SUPERMARKET
 ^
 D03/03/10
 T-421.35
 PSPRINGFIELD WATER UTILITY
 ^
 ...etc.

Header line
The first line in the file must be a header line, to identify the type of data contained.  Valid values for accounts are:

There are also values for QIF files of internal Quicken information:

A header line is not followed by a separator line; it is immediately followed by the first field of a detail item.

Detail items
The Detail section consists of several Detail Items, each on a separate line.  Each line begins with a single character identifying code in the first column, followed by the literal data for that field.  The detail item is terminated by a separator line.  The fields can be in any order (except that within split transactions, the category, amount, and memo must be adjacent).  If a single transaction block contains several detail items with same code, the last row is used for import.

Standard detail item

Investment Actions

Notes
 The S, E, $, and % fields are repeated for each split of this transaction.
 For investment action codes that end in X, the Category field indicates the other account used to transfer cash from or to.
 If the line immediately following an XS record does not begin with ^ or X, that is considered a continuation of the XS record.

All the fields in detail items are optional—if not included, that field will be left blank in the imported transaction.  Also, Quicken seems to do little error checking on these items; if the same field is included twice in the detail item, the second one will just overwrite the first one.

Record end
The separator line signals the end of the current transaction.  The last detail item in the file should end with a separator line.

Export workarounds for QuickBooks: exporting to QIF
QuickBooks doesn't allow exporting to QIF. Only the Intuit Interchange Format (IIF) is supported. An IIF to QIF converter will not solve the problem either, as journal entries can't be exported in IIF format, only lists are exportable. A viable way to overcome this problem is to set up a journal report, to show all journal entries. Print the report using the "print to file" option. Set the file type to Excel before printing. Rename the extension of the resulting file from PRN to CSV. Use this XL2QIF Excel macro to convert to QIF. The Excel file may need to be reorganized to generate the appropriate format for the macro to work, such as separating cheque accounts from term deposits, etc. The above referenced Excel macro supports split transactions.

See references for further examples of reporting to excel

Import workarounds for Quicken 2005+: importing from QIF
While Intuit officially only supports QIF importing on asset, liability, cash, small business payable, and invoice accounts, Quicken will still allow you to import transactions using QIF into any account type.  Two methods are explained below:

Indirect (Temporary cash account) method
Note: If you really need to get data from a QIF file into an account that does not support QIF imports (e.g. Quicken 2005 and later), you can import from the QIF file into a (temporary) Cash account. Make sure the first line in the QIF file says "!Type:Cash" for importing it into a Quicken Cash account. (QIF files can be edited in any text editor.) After importing the transactions, you can copy/paste them into a register of your choice. Tested in 2006 version. Note that you cannot copy cash transactions into brokerage accounts in Quicken 2007.

Direct method
To import transactions into brokerage accounts (or any account), a little text editing is necessary.  Ensure to prefix your transaction data by copying-and-pasting the top four lines from the example below - the example is for an investment transaction:

!Account
NJoint Brokerage Account
TInvst
^
!Type:Invst
D12/21' 7
NBuy
YIBM
T11010.00
I110.10
Q100
MPurchase of 100 shares of IBM stock on 21 December 2007 at $110.10 per share
^

Line 2 (N) in the example must contain the exact name of the account you are intending to import into.  If you use an account name that does not exist, Quicken will ask if you want to create a new account (This functionality has been test in Quicken 2012).  When importing the file, the account you choose in the QIF-import-dialog box is irrelevant (you can even choose "all accounts") - once you begin the import process, the application will prompt to confirm importing to the intended account. In order to be successfully read by Quicken the text file must be saved in ANSI format. Files saved in UTF-8 format will not be correctly processed.

The example above was tested in Quicken 2007, Quicken 2008, Quicken 2010, Quicken 2012, Quicken 2015 and an equivalently formatted text file using "TCCard" instead of "TInvst" under Quicken 2011.

If the transactions are being imported into an existing account, make sure to reconcile the account in the old data file before creating the QIF export file.  Before accepting an import, validate any 'Match' transactions and change to 'New' where there isn't really a match.  Quicken can match on amounts even when the dates are significantly different.

When editing the QIF file, check for any transaction Category (the field starting with 'L') for an account name contained in brackets, such as [Checking Account].  The brackets reference another quicken account, and if left in place will post a transaction in that account in addition to the account being imported to, with potentially troublesome results.  Avoid this by removing the text including the brackets and replacing with another category if desired.  The only exception to this is an opening balance transaction, identified by 'Opening Balance' in the 'P' field (POpening Balance).  In this case, the brackets need to be left in place, and the account name between the brackets must exactly match the account name in the 'N' field.

The above two paragraphs are based on exporting and importing in Quicken 2010.

Sample Account Export
An account with the following five transactions shown in the screenshot below was exported to a qif file. The content of that file is shown immediately beneath with commentary to the right of the transactions to better pair them against the table generated from an Account Transactions report of the sample account.

QIF File Content!Type:Bank                       --------------------------------------------------------------
D2/10'2020
T0.00
CX                                    ACCOUNT DETAILS
POpening Balance
L[TestExport]
^                                --------------------------------------------------------------
D2/14'2020
T67.50
PT-Mobile
LBills:Cell Phone                     T-Mobile Transaction
SBills:Cell Phone                        (+/- split)
Esign up credit                          (memos for splits, no overall memo)
$-15.00
SBills:Cell Phone
Enew account
$82.50
^                                --------------------------------------------------------------
D2/14'2020
Mmoney back for damaged parcel
T32.00                                US Post Office Transaction
PUS Post Office                          (credit)
LMiscellaneous                           (overall memo)
^                                --------------------------------------------------------------
D2/12'2020
Mtwo transactions, equal
T-10.00
PTarget                               Target Transaction
LFood:Groceries
SFood:Groceries
E50%
$-5.00
SFood:Groceries
E50% 2
$-5.00
^                                --------------------------------------------------------------
D2/11'2020
CX
Mnon split transaction                Walmart Transaction
T-25.00                                  (non-split/single)
N123                                     (cleared status reconciled)
PWalmart                                 (includes check number)
LFood:Groceries
^                                --------------------------------------------------------------
D2/10'2020
C*
Mtest order 1
T-100.00
PAmazon.com                           Amazon Transaction
LFood:Groceries                          (split)
SFood:Groceries                          (cleared status clear)
E50%
$-50.00
STransportation:Automobile
E25%
$-25.00
SPersonal Care:Haircare
E10%
$-10.00
SHealthcare:Prescriptions
E15%
$-15.00
^                                --------------------------------------------------------------

References

 What is the Quicken interchange format (QIF)?

External links
Official Specification. Archived from  the original on 2010-02-22.
Python script to convert QIF to RDF. Look for def extract(path). Script provided by SWAP.
Perl module to parse and create QIF files.
GnuCash QIF format notes
.NET QIF API
How to parse online bank QIF with sed. Archived from the original on 2013-09-02.
Introduction to the QIF file
Qif viewer

Computer file formats
Financial software